HD 150136 is a multiple star system in the southern constellation of Ara, around 4,300 light years away.  It is the brightest member of the faint open cluster NGC 6193, part of the Ara OB1 association.

System

HD 150136 is listed in the Washington Double Star Catalog as having seven visual components within .  Component A is a close triple system containing three massive class O main sequence stars.  The brightest companion is catalogued individually as HD 150135 as well as component C of the multiple system, separated by only 10 arcseconds.  It is another O class spectroscopic binary and also a member of NGC 5193.  The other catalogued components are all 10th to 12th magnitude, similar to many other stars known to be members of NGC 6193.

The primary star consists of a double-lined spectroscopic binary with a more distant tertiary companion. The third star is orbiting the other two with a period of 8.2 years, an eccentricity of 0.73, and an inclination of 108°.  The close binary stars are separated by hardly more than their own diameters and orbit in less than 3 days, but the third is separated enough to have been resolved visually by VLTI.  The measured separation in 2012 was 9 milli-arcseconds, corresponding to 11-12 AU.

Properties
All three (four, including HD 150135) of the brightest stars are massive luminous O class main sequence stars, 27 to 54 times as massive as the Sun.  They are around 10 times the size of the Sun, but 6-8 times hotter and each is over 100,000 times as luminous. The primary star is the closest O3 star to Earth, visually 18,000 times as bright as the sun, but because of its high temperature it is around three quarters of a million times more luminous including all wavelengths.

References

External links
 
 HR 6187
 Image HD 150136
 CCDM J16413-4846
 NGC 6193

Ara (constellation)
150136
Triple star systems
6187
O-type main-sequence stars
081702
Durchmusterung objects
Emission-line stars